Copelin is a surname. Notable people with the surname include:

 Campbell Copelin (1902–1988), English actor
 Chad Copelin, American producer, audio engineer, musician, and songwriter
 Sherman Copelin (born 1943), American politician and businessman